St Agnes' Lifeboat Station was situated in St Agnes, Isles of Scilly and provided a service for the Royal National Lifeboat Institution from 1891 to 1920. The lifeboat station and slipway still exist, and have been identified by the Isles of Scilly Council as a Building of Local Significance.

Lifeboats at St Agnes

History

The station opened in 1891 with a single slipway. A new slipway was provided in 1904 at a cost of £5,000 to the designs of the Institution’s Architect, W.T. Douglass. It was built of Jarrah wood from Western Australia, bolted to granite and concrete pillars, with the exception of a short piece at the upper end, built on the rocks. Two rails ran the entire length of the slip, on which rested the double bogey trolley that carried the boat. Rails were also laid down the old slip which could be used at high tide.

Awards

On 13 December 1907, the Thomas W Lawson of Boston, USA, was in distress off Annet. The St Agnes Lifeboat put William Thomas Hicks on board to act as pilot. But the schooner foundered at Minmanueth and he was lost together with fifteen of the vessel’s crew. His son, Frederick Charles Hicks, put off with seven other men in the gig ‘Slippen’ which rescued the schooner’s captain and engineer form Hellweather rock.

Frederick Charles Hicks was awarded the RNLI Silver Medal for bravery, when swimming from a gig to save the captain of the Thomas W Lawson. The United States government gave him a gold watch, and gold medals to all the crewe of the gig ‘Slippen’.

References

History of the Isles of Scilly
Lifeboat stations in the Isles of Scilly
Lifeboat